A Teacher's Crime is a 2008 American-Canadian TV movie directed by Robert Malenfant.
Main characters are Ashley Jones as the teacher Carrie Ryans and Erik Knudsen as her student Jeremy Rander.

Storyline
The drama is about a female High school teacher and a male student in his senior year (an orphan). He pretends to be in need of attention and they become friends. She gets caught in the master plan of Jeremy and his uncle. Carrie and her father are accused of committing crimes that are actually done by Jeremy or his uncle. Knowing she inherited money from her deceased millionaire father, Jeremy and his uncle proceed to blackmail her for $500,000 by using incriminating photographs of her and Jeremy.

External links
www.imdb.com Entry "A Teacher's Crime"

2008 television films
2008 films
American crime thriller films
2000s crime thriller films
Canadian crime thriller films
English-language Canadian films
Canadian television films
American television films
2000s American films
2000s Canadian films